Jacob Lane Bentley (born November 23, 1997) is an American football coach and former player who is currently the quarterbacks coach at the University of North Alabama. Bentley played college football for the South Carolina Gamecocks, the Utah Utes, and the South Alabama Jaguars.

Early years
Bentley attended James F. Byrnes High School in Duncan, South Carolina as a freshman, where his father, Bobby Bentley, had been the head coach. He transferred to Opelika High School in Opelika, Alabama, after his father took a coaching role with the Auburn Tigers. As a junior, he passed for 2,834 yards and 28 touchdowns. Bentley reclassified and graduated early after his junior season after his father became a coach for the South Carolina Gamecocks. He committed to the University of South Carolina to play college football.

College career

South Carolina

2016 season
Bentley entered his true freshman year at South Carolina in 2016 as a redshirt behind starter Perry Orth and Brandon Mcllwain. After the Gamecocks started the season with a 2–4 record, Bentley's redshirt was removed. He made his first career start against UMass. The following week he led the Gamecocks to an upset victory over nationally ranked Tennessee and retained the starting quarterback position after that. He finished the season completing 125 of 190 passes for 1,420 yards, nine touchdowns and four interceptions.

2017
In 2017, Bentley started every game at quarterback for the Gamecocks, leading the team to a 9–4 record, including a come-from-behind victory over Michigan in the Outback Bowl on January 1, 2018. Bentley finished the season with 2,794 yards passing, throwing for 18 touchdowns and rushing for 6.

2018
Bentley started the first four games for the Gamecocks in 2018, compiling a 2–2 record with seven touchdowns and six interceptions. On October 6, 2018, Bentley missed his first start since his freshman year after sustaining a knee sprain in the previous week's loss to Kentucky. Senior Michael Scarnecchia started in his place, leading the Gamecocks to a 37–35 win over Missouri. Bentley's roommate Parker White kicked the game-winning field goal with two seconds left.

On November 24, 2018, Bentley set the South Carolina single-game passing record when he threw for 510 yards in a 56–35 loss to undefeated, second-ranked, and eventual National Champion Clemson at Death Valley.

2019 
Bentley was named starting quarterback for the 2019 season, but suffered a foot injury in the first game of the season, the 2019 Belk Kickoff Game against North Carolina. As a result, he was benched and freshman quarterback Ryan Hilinski was named starting quarterback. On September 8, 2019, it was reported that Bentley would have season-ending surgery on his foot. At the end of the 2019 season, Bentley announced he would be transferring schools for his last year of eligibility. On December 9, Bentley announced that he would be transferring to the University of Utah for the 2020 season.

Utah

2020
Bentley was originally announced as the backup quarterback for the 2020 season, behind Texas transfer Cameron Rising, but after Rising was injured in the season opener against USC, Bentley was named the starter for the remaining games.  Bentley completed 62 percent of his passes in his season with the Utes.  

Following the season finale against Washington State, in which Bentley threw an interception in the second quarter and was benched in favor of walk-on Drew Lisk, Bentley, for the second time in his collegiate career, entered the NCAA Transfer Portal.

South Alabama

2021
On January 7, 2021, Bentley announced that he would be playing his final season at the University of South Alabama. He appeared in ten games for the Jaguars, throwing for 2476 yards, 17 touchdowns, and 8 interceptions.

Statistics

Coaching career

Florida Atlantic 
In early 2022, it was announced that Bentley was joining the Florida Atlantic football program as a graduate assistant, working with head coach Willie Taggart.

North Alabama
On December 8, 2022, he was announced as the quarterbacks coach at  North Alabama.

Personal life
His stepbrother Chas Dodd played quarterback at Rutgers and is now a graduate assistant strength and conditioning coach at the University of Miami.

References

External links
South Carolina Gamecocks bio

1997 births
Living people
Players of American football from South Carolina
People from Duncan, South Carolina
American football quarterbacks
South Carolina Gamecocks football players
Utah Utes football players
South Alabama Jaguars football players